Gigi is a musical with a book and lyrics by Alan Jay Lerner and music by Frederick Loewe. It is based on the 1944 novella Gigi by Colette and 1958 hit musical film of the same name.  The story concerns Gigi, a free-spirited teenaged girl living in Paris at the turn of the 20th century.  She is being groomed as a courtesan in her family's tradition. Before she is deemed ready for her social debut, she encounters the bon vivant bachelor Gaston Lachaille, whom she captivates as she is transformed into a charmingly poised young lady.

The original Broadway production, produced by Edwin Lester in 1973, ran for a disappointing 103 performances but won the Tony Award for Best Score.  A West End production played in 1985.

A new production of the musical, adapted by Heidi Thomas and directed by Eric D. Schaeffer, premiered at the Kennedy Center (Washington, DC) in January 2015, and ran on Broadway from April 8 to June 21, 2015 at the Neil Simon Theatre.

Background
Gigi originated as a 1945 novella by Colette, which was adapted for the screen with Danièle Delorme in 1948. In 1951 Anita Loos adapted the novel for the stage, and the Broadway production of Gigi starred Audrey Hepburn in her first major role.

Seven years later, while My Fair Lady was in Philadelphia prior to its Broadway opening, Arthur Freed approached Lerner about a feature film musical adaptation. Although Loewe had vowed never to work in movies, he was charmed by the book and agreed to collaborate on the project. The 1958 film of Gigi proved to be a major critical and commercial success and the winner of nine Academy Awards, including Best Picture.

Productions

Original productions 
Edwin Lester, founder of the Los Angeles Civic Light Opera, asked for a stage version of the film Gigi, and Lerner and Loewe then wrote the stage musical. They added four songs and a ballet for the stage adaptation. Gigi premiered at the Curran Theatre, San Francisco, on May 15, 1973, and then embarked on a six-month tour.

The musical opened on Broadway on November 13, 1973 at the Uris Theatre, where it ran for 103 performances and seven previews. Directed by Joseph Hardy and choreographed by Onna White, the cast featured Karin Wolfe as Gigi, Daniel Massey as Gaston, Maria Karnilova as Mamita, Agnes Moorehead as Aunt Alicia, and Alfred Drake as Honoré.  Arlene Francis replaced the ailing Moorehead later in the run (Moorehead died of cancer on April 30, 1974).  An original cast recording was released by RCA Victor.  Louis Jourdan starred in a production that toured the United States in the mid 1980s, not in his original role as Gaston, but rather as Honoré.

The West End production opened on 17 September 1985 at the Lyric Theatre, where it ran for seven months. The cast included Amanda Waring as Gigi and Geoffrey Burridge as Gaston, with Beryl Reid as Mamita, Siân Phillips as Aunt Alicia, and Jean-Pierre Aumont as Honoré.

A London cast album was released by First Night Records.

Revival productions 
A production of the musical, newly adapted by Heidi Thomas, directed by Eric D. Schaeffer, and with choreography by Josh Bergasse, opened at the Kennedy Center's Eisenhower Theatre, from January 16, 2015 to February 12, 2015. Vanessa Hudgens played the role of "Gigi".

On January 14, 2015, it was announced that the Kennedy Center production of Gigi would transfer to Broadway with a cast led by Vanessa Hudgens. The production began previews on March 19, 2015 at the Neil Simon Theatre and officially opened on April 8.  It closed on June 21, 2015. The Show was lead produced by Jenna Segal with scenic design by Derek McLane, costume design by Catherine Zuber, lighting design by Natasha Katz, and sound design by Kai Harada. A national tour was also scheduled in the 2016–2017 season but was not produced, and was available for licensing from Tams-Witmark Music Library.

A Broadway cast album, produced and engineered by six-time Grammy winner Frank Filipetti, was released by DMI Records in June 2015.

Synopsis
Honoré Lachaille explains that in turn-of-the-20th-century Paris, marriage is not the only option. His nephew Gaston is a rich bon vivant, much like his uncle. But Gaston is bored with the high life and his series of mistresses. The one thing he truly enjoys is spending time with an old friend of his uncle, Madame Alvarez, whom he calls Mamita, and especially her granddaughter, the precocious, carefree Gilberte or "Gigi".  Gaston's Uncle Honoré was involved romantically with Mamita, although advancing age has confused their recollections of the past.

Madame Alvarez sends Gigi to her Aunt Alicia's to learn to be a high-society courtesan in their family's tradition. Gigi is initially a very poor student, as she does not understand the reasons behind her education and finds Parisians' obsession with making love inexplicable. She does, however, enjoy spending time with Gaston, whom she treats as an older brother.  Alicia is unhappy to discover that Gaston took Gigi and Madame Alvarez on holiday, as her sister had not consulted her.  She insists that Gigi's education must increase dramatically if she is to catch a prize such as Gaston. Mamita is shocked, but sees the advantages it could bring Gigi and so goes along with the plan - though neither tells Gigi of their scheming. Gigi is miserable in her lessons, but puts up with them as a necessary evil, though she still seems awkward and bumbling to her perfectionist aunt.

Gaston visits and is shocked to see Gigi in an alluring white gown. He tells her she looks ridiculous and storms out, but returns later and apologizes, offering to make it up by taking her to dinner. Mamita refuses, telling Gaston that, with his reputation, a young girl seen in his company might be labelled in such a way as could damage her future. Gaston is enraged again, storms out, and wanders the streets of Paris in a fury.

Gaston realises that he has fallen in love with Gigi. He returns to Mamita and strikes a business arrangement to take Gigi as his mistress, promising to provide the girl with luxury and kindness. He visits Gigi later, but she tells him she does not wish to become someone's mistress; she wants more for herself than to be passed between men, only desired until they grow tired of her and she is moved on to another. Gaston is horrified at this portrayal of the life he wishes to give her, and leaves stunned. Later, however, Gigi contacts him; when Gaston returns, Gigi says she would "rather be miserable with [him] than without [him]."

Later that night Gigi emerges from her room prepared to accept her fate and take up her role as Gaston's mistress. For the first time, she appears as a woman, not a young girl. Gaston is enchanted when he picks Gigi up to take her to dinner at Maxim's, a popular Paris restaurant. Gigi's awkwardness is gone and she seems perfectly at ease. Nevertheless, patrons' stares make Gaston uncomfortable as he realises Gigi's interpretation of things may have been accurate after all.  He discovers that his love for her makes the idea of her as his mistress an unbearable one. Angered by Honoré's comments, Gaston leaves the party with Gigi in tow, taking her home without explanation. A weeping Gigi begs to know what she has done to offend him, but Gaston does not answer until he arrives at Mamita's and humbly asks for Gigi's hand in marriage.

Songs

Original Broadway production

Act I
 Overture
 Thank Heaven for Little Girls - Honoré
 It's A Bore - Honoré and Gaston
 The Earth and Other Minor Things - Gigi
 Paris is Paris Again - Honoré and Ensemble
 She's Not Thinking of Me - Gaston
 It's A Bore (Reprise) - Honoré, Gaston, Manuel and Aunt Alicia
 The Night They Invented Champagne - Gigi, Gaston and Mamita
 I Remember It Well - Honoré and Mamita
 I Never Want To Go Home Again - Gigi and Ensemble

Act II
 Gigi - Gaston
 The Contract - Alicia, Mamita, Duclos and Du Fresne
 I'm Glad I'm Not Young Anymore - Honoré
 In This Wide, Wide World - Gigi
 Thank Heaven for Little Girls (reprise) - Honoré

2015 Broadway revival

Act I
 Paris is Paris Again - Honoré, Liane, Gigi and Parisians
 It's a Bore - Honoré and Gaston
 The Parisians - Gigi
 A Toujours - Liane
 The Parisians (Reprise) - Gigi
 The Gossips - Parisians
 She's Not Thinking of Me - Gaston
 Thank Heaven for Little Girls - Mamita and Aunt Alicia
 Paris is Paris Again (Reprise) - Gaston, Honoré, Liane and Parisians
 I Remember It Well - Mamita and Honoré
 The Night They Invented Champagne - Gigi, Mamita, Gaston and Ensemble

Act II      
 I Never Want to Go Home Again - Gigi
 Thank Heaven for Little Girls (Reprise) - Aunt Alicia
 Gigi - Gaston
 The Contract - Aunt Alicia, Mamita, Dufresne, Bonfils, Martel and the Lawyers
 I'm Glad I'm Not Young Anymore - Mamita and Honoré
 The Letter - Gigi
 Say a Prayer - Mamita
 The Gossips (Reprise) - Parisians
 In This Wide, Wide World - Gigi and Gaston

Casting

Awards and nominations

Original Broadway production

2015 Broadway revival

References

External links

Gigi on Broadway (2015 production)
Gigi Production and Synopsis at Tams-Witmark
Gigi at Ovrtur.com

1973 musicals
Broadway musicals
Colette
Musicals based on films
Musicals based on novels
Musicals by Frederick Loewe
Musicals by Alan Jay Lerner
Plays set in France
Tony Award-winning musicals